Denise Robertson  (9 June 1932 – 31 March 2016) was a British writer and television broadcaster. She made her television debut as the presenter of the Junior Advice Line segment of the BBC's Breakfast Time programme in 1985, though she is best known as the resident agony aunt on the ITV show This Morning from its first broadcast on 3 October 1988 until her death. In the course of her career, she dealt with over 200,000 letters from viewers seeking advice. In 2006 she was appointed as a Member of the Order of the British Empire for services to broadcasting.

Early life
Born Margaret Denise Mary Broderick on 9 June 1932 in Sunderland, County Durham, she was the youngest of two daughters of Herbert Stanley (1889–1961) and Catherine Maud Broderick (née Cahill, 1896–1970). Herbert ran a shipping business that failed before she was born. She attended Sunderland High School.

Career
Her first job was as a clerk at Sunderland Royal Infirmary. She then progressed to the position of medical secretary and later became a counsellor. She won a BBC competition to write a play and became an agony aunt on Metro Radio in Newcastle. In addition to This Morning, Robertson briefly hosted her own television series Dear Denise in 2000. She also featured as a love and relationships pundit on Dave Gorman's Important Astrology Experiment in 2002. She ran an advice website called DearDenise.com and wrote a monthly column for national magazine, Candis. Robertson also made regular appearances on Channel 5's Big Brother's Bit on the Side.

Personal life
Robertson was twice widowed; she married Alexander Inkster "Alex" Robertson (1919–1972) in 1960 and they had a son Mark Alexander (born 1962). Alexander Robertson died of lung cancer in 1972. In 1973, she married John "Jack" Tomlin (1921–1995);  he died of a stroke in 1995. 

She then married her childhood friend Bryan Thubron in 1997. Robertson was a keen supporter of Sunderland A.F.C. and had worked with the University of Sunderland, appearing as guest speaker at graduation ceremonies. She lived in East Boldon, Sunderland.

Honours
In 1998, Robertson was appointed a Deputy Lieutenant of County Durham. She was given the Freedom of the City of Sunderland in 2006 and appointed a Member of the Order of the British Empire (MBE) in the Birthday Honours that year for "services to Broadcasting and to Charity".

Death 
Robertson died on 31 March 2016, aged 83, at the Royal Marsden Hospital, London after being diagnosed in early 2016 with pancreatic cancer. She made the diagnosis public in February 2016 on the television show This Morning after being absent from her usual posting as agony aunt. This Morning aired a special edition tribute programme on 1 April 2016. Her funeral took place on 13 April 2016 at Sunderland Minster, and she was buried in Sunderland Cemetery in Grangetown.

Filmography

Works
 Don't Cry Aloud Hopcyn Press 2015 
 Winds of War Little Books 2009 
 None To Make You Cry Little Books 2009  
 The Promise Little Books 2008 
 The Second Wife Little Books 2008 
 Agony? Don't Get Me Started... Autobiography Max Press 2006  
 The Bad Sister Little Books 2005  
 Relax It's Only a Baby Little Books 2005 
 Men Are From Earth. Women Are From Earth.: Deal with It! Little Books 2005  
 Sir Tom Cowie, A True Entrepreneur: A Biography University of Sunderland 2004  
 A Relative Freedom 
 Wait For the Day  
 The Beloved People (Belgate Trilogy 1) 2004  
 Strength for the Morning (Belgate Trilogy 2) 2004  
 Towards Jerusalem (Belgate Trilogy 3) 2005 
 A Year of Winter 1986 
 The Land of Lost Content 1985 
 Blue Remembered Hills 1987

References

External links 

 
 Denise Robertson returns to Uganda

1932 births
2016 deaths
Deaths from cancer in England
Deaths from pancreatic cancer
Deputy Lieutenants of Durham
English people of Irish descent
English television presenters
Members of the Order of the British Empire
People from Sunderland
Writers from Tyne and Wear